Gulbarga Institute of Medical Sciences (GIMS) is a medical college located in Gulbarga, Karnataka and run by the Government of Karnataka. The institution is affiliated to Rajiv Gandhi University of Health Sciences.

Attached Hospitals
The teaching hospitals attached to the institution are Government District Teaching Hospital Gulbarga. Government District Hospital is a government run 750 bed hospital with felicities a Regional Diagnostic Laboratory, Dialysis Unit, Blood Bank, Mortuary / PM, X-Ray, Burns Ward, ART Centre and Ayush Center.

Admissions

Undergraduate courses

M.B.B.S. 
The college offers the four and a half year M.B.B.S. course with a one-year compulsory rotating internship in affiliated hospitals.

Departments

ANATOMY
PHYSIOLOGY
BIOCHEMISTRY
PHARMACOLOGY
PATHOLOGY
MICROBIOLOGY
FORENSIC MEDICINE
COMMUNITY MEDICINE
GENERAL MEDICINE
PEDIATRIC
TB AND CHEST
SKIN & V D
PSYCHIATRY
GENERAL SURGERY
ORTHOPEDICS
ENT
OPHTHALMOLOGY
OBG
ANESTHESIA
RADIOLOGY
DENTISTRY

References

External links
 

Medical colleges in Karnataka
Universities and colleges in Kalaburagi district
Medical colleges in Hyderabad-Karnataka
Education in Kalaburagi
Companies based in Kalaburagi